Hinterland is a 2021 Austrian-Luxembourgish crime thriller film directed by Stefan Ruzowitzky. Starring Murathan Muslu and Liv Lisa Fries, the film is set in Vienna in 1920, after the fall of the Austro-Hungarian Empire. Former detective Peter Perg (Murathan Muslu) returns home after at the end of World War I, having spent years as a prisoner of war. After a series of killings of other POWs, he joins forces with forensic doctor Theresa Körner (Liv Lisa Fries) to solve the crimes.

The film premiered at the 74th Locarno Film Festival on 6 August 2021 and won Prix du public UBS Award. Its German premiere is set for 7 October 2021.

Cast
 Murathan Muslu as Peter Perg
 Liv Lisa Fries as Dr. Theresa Körner
 Max von der Groeben as Kommissar Paul Severin
 Marc Limpach as Polizeirat Victor Renner 
 Aaron Friesz as Kovacs
 Stipe Erceg as Bauer
 Margarethe Tiesel as Hausmeisterin Subotic
 Matthias Schweighöfer
 Miriam Fontaine as Anna Perg
 Lukas Johne as Vorarbeiter
 Wolfgang Pissecker as Gefängniswärter
 Konstantin Rommelfangen as Sesta
 Fabian Schiffkorn as Polizist
 Eugen Victor as Portier
 Timo Wagner as Oberleutnant Krainer
 Lukas Walcher as Heresmaty
 Trystan Pütter as Rudolf Gerster
 Germain Wagner as Graf von Starkenberg

Production 
The film was shot to a large extent with the blue screen technology, the scenes were mainly created on the computer. In July 2021, a trailer of the film was released.

Awards and nominations

References

External links 
 
 Hinterland on Austrian films
 Hinterland at Production website (Amour Fou Filmproduktion)

2021 films
2021 thriller films
2020s German-language films
Austrian historical thriller films
Films directed by Stefan Ruzowitzky
Films set in 1920
Films set in Vienna
Anti-war films about World War I